Rawin Nontaket ((born 19 June 1988) is a Thai professional footballer who plays for Phrae United.

References

External links
 Goal.com 
 Players Profile - info.thscore.com
 

1988 births
Living people
Jiranat Nontaket
Jiranat Nontaket
Association football central defenders
Jiranat Nontaket
Jiranat Nontaket
Jiranat Nontaket
Jiranat Nontaket
Jiranat Nontaket